Japan X-Clusive is the first compilation album by New York City DJ group The X-Ecutioners. It was originally released in 1997 and, like the title said, was exclusive in Japan. The album contained several Japanese rap artists, along with production by The X-Ecutioners. It was later re-released through North America in 1998.

Track listing
"Ginga Tankenki" (Remix) (Rhymehead) 
"Michi Naru Tane" (Naked Artz featuring Rhymester)
"For Da Bad Boys and Ladies" (Illmariachi featuring Ikooru) 
"Kyotou 98" (Naked Artz featuring Rappagariya) 
"Specialist" (Real Styla) 
"X-Hibition 1" (The X-Ecutioners & Naked Artz) 
"Kagi" (Naked Artz)
"Real Styla" (Real Styla) 
"X-Hibition 2" (The X-Ecutioners) 
"Outtakes 1" (The X-Ecutioners) 
"X-Hibition 3" (The X-Ecutioners) 
"Raida's Theme" (The X-Ecutioners) 
"X-Hibition 4" (The X-Ecutioners) 
"I and I" (Mr Drunk remix) (Naked Artz) 
"Yabasugiru Skill part II" (Rappagariya featuring Skip) 
"Oosouji" (King Giddra)  
"Mimawasou" (King Giddra) 
"Kotoba No Kagaku" (Rappagariya) 
"X-Hibition 5" (The X-Ecutioners) 
"Outtakes 2" (The X-Ecutioners, King Giddra, & Mimawasou)

The X-Ecutioners albums
1998 compilation albums